National Primary Route 14, or just Route 14 (or ) is a National Road Route of Costa Rica, located in the Puntarenas province.

Description
In Puntarenas province the route covers Golfito canton (Golfito, Guaycará districts).

References

Highways in Costa Rica